Levering may refer to:

People
 Levering (surname)

Places
 Levering, Michigan, United States
 Levering Hall, Ohio, United States
 Levering Mission, Oklahoma, United States

Other
 Levering Act, California, United States
 William Levering School, currently known as AMY Northwest Middle School